Allahverdi Khan (c. 1560 – June 3, 1613) was an Iranian general and statesman of Georgian origin who, initially a  gholām ("military slave"), rose to high office in the Safavid state.

Iskandar Beg Munshi, the Safavid court historian at the time, describes him as "one of the most powerful statesman to hold office under this dynasty", and a "man of great forbearance, modest and chaste.” King Abbas I demonstrated his genuine respect and affection for him by personally supervising the funeral arrangements, and by going to his house the day after his death to offer his personal condolences to his family.

Biography

Background
Allahverdi was born a Christian Georgian, surnamed Undiladze. Like many of his compatriots and fellow Christian Georgians, Armenians and Circassians, he was taken prisoner in the course of one of the Caucasian campaigns of shah Tahmasp I of Persia and converted to Islam to be trained for service in the gholam army, a special military structure consisting of Christian captives that was created later by Abbas I to counterpoise the power of the Qizilbash, which constituted the nucleus of the Safavid military aristocracy.

Service under Shah Abbas I
In 1589, he took part in the assassination of the powerful minister (vakil) and kingmaker Morshed-Kholi Khan Ostaglu, who was secretly condemned to death by Shah Abbas I. As a result, he was made sultan and a governor of Jorpadagan near Isfahan, the Safavid capital. He then rapidly rose to higher offices and was appointed commander of the gholam army (qollar-aghasi), thus becoming one of the five principal officers in the Safavid administration by 1595/6. In the same year, Shah Abbas I appointed him the governor of Fars, a move that made him the first gholam to attain equal status with the Qizilbash emirs. This act also meant that the large provinces would no longer be administered by semi-autonomous and frequently self-minded Qizilbash emirs, but by officers appointed directly by the Shah.

In 1596/7, he was transferred to the governorship of Kohgiluyeh. In 1597, two clans of the Afshar tribe, the Arsahlu and Gundzulu, together with some Lur and Arab tribes, rebelled at Ramhormoz. However, it was shortly suppressed by Allahverdi Khan.

In August 1598, Allahverdi Khan, as a sardar-e-lashkar (commander-in-chief), was instrumental in recovering Herat from the Uzbek tribes and shortly after this victory was ordered by the shah to put a powerful Qizilbash emir Farhad Khan Qaramanlu to death. This act turned Allahverdi Khan into the most powerful man in the Persian Empire after the shah. From 1600 onwards, counseled by the English gentleman of fortune, Sir Robert Sherley, he reorganized the army and strengthened it by increasing the number of gholam troops from 4,000 to 25,000.

Allahverdi Khan led the Persian armies in a number of successful campaigns on both the eastern and the western frontiers of the Safavid empire, including the 1601-2 conquest of Bahrain. In 1605, during the Ottoman–Safavid War of 1603–1618, Allahverdi Khan besieged the Ottoman city of Van. During the siege, he was informed of Ottoman reinforcements under Mehmed Pasha marching towards the city. He then sent an army under Qarachaqay Khan to stop the reinforcements from arriving, which he successfully accomplished. However, Allahverdi Khan later lifted the siege, and returned to Abbas I, who was in Khoy. On 6 November, Allahverdi Khan took part in the battle of Sufiyan, where the Safavids decisively defeated the Ottomans.

Death and burial 
Allahverdi Khan died on 3 June 1613, during a visit at Isfahan. His death greatly saddened Abbas I, who accompanied his bier to a place where the corpses of the deceased were ritually washed and prepared for the burial. Abbas I also visited the house of Allahverdi Khan's family in Isfahan, where he offered his condolences. He thereafter appointed Allahverdi Khan's son Imam-Quli Khan as the governor of Fars, thus succeeding his deceased father. Allahverdi Khan was buried in an exquisite tomb at Mashhad. His tomb was built next to the Imam Reza shrine as a unique way of respect, which reflects his standing and status in the Safavid empire. The tomb still stands to this day; it is an elegant two-storied octagonal structure with marble slabs and tiles sheathing the interior.

Allahverdi also had another son named Daud Khan, who would later serve as the governor of Ganja and Karabakh.

Legacy

Allahverdi Khan presided over construction of several public buildings and charitable foundations. The Si-o-se-pol bridge across the Zayandeh River built by the architect Mir Jamal al-Din Muhammad Jabiri in Isfahan under Allahverdi Khan's patronage still bears the general's name. Allahverdi Khan is furthermore credited with several other building works, such as a large double dam near Sarab; a fortification around a village in Fars; a large qaysariyya, or royal market, in Lar, which impressed the Spanish envoy García de Silva Figueroa; and a stately house near Nahavand for Abbas I. Allahverdi Khan also initiated the construction of a large theological college, Madrasa Khan, in Shiraz as a teaching base for the Islamic scholar Mulla Sadra. The project would be completed by his son Imam-Quli Khan.

See also 
Georgians in Iran

References

Sources 

 
 
 
 
 
 Mikaberidze, Alexander (ed., 2007). Allahverdi Khan. Dictionary of Georgian National Biography.
 
 
 
 
 

1613 deaths
16th-century people from Georgia (country)
17th-century people from Georgia (country)
Safavid generals
Iranian military commanders
Iranian people of Georgian descent
Converts to Shia Islam from Christianity
Safavid ghilman
1590 births
Shia Muslims from Georgia (country)
Safavid governors of Fars
Undiladze
Qollar-aghasi
16th-century people of Safavid Iran
17th-century people of Safavid Iran
Burials at Imam Reza Shrine